Liquid nitriding may refer to:

Salt bath nitriding
Salt bath ferritic nitrocarburizing